Rasskazikha is a rural locality (a selo) and the administrative center of Rasskazikhinsky Selsoviet, Pervomaysky District, Altai Krai, Russia. The population was 516 as of 2013. There are 11 streets.

Geography 
Rasskazikha is located on the Ob River, 45 km south of Novoaltaysk (the district's administrative centre) by road. Bobrovka is the nearest rural locality.

References 

Rural localities in Pervomaysky District, Altai Krai